Loyola High School, Vinukonda is a private Catholic primary and secondary school located in Vinukonda, Guntur, in the state of Andhra Pradesh, India. The school was established in the 1960s by the Society of Jesus in conjunction with the Missionary Sisters of the Immaculate Conception.

Overview 
Loyola High School is part of the Vinukonda Mission that was founded in 1960. With the help of the Missionary Sisters of the Immaculate Conception, Rev. Fr. T. Baliah, SJ set up a dispensary, a high school for girls, and then in 1970 a primary school both for boys and girls. With a large number of students, Rev. Baliah started a Telugu language high school for boys.

In 2009 an English medium high school was launched.

See also

 List of Jesuit schools

References  

Jesuit secondary schools in India
Jesuit primary schools in India
Schools in Guntur district
Christian schools in Andhra Pradesh
1960s establishments in Andhra Pradesh
Educational institutions established in the 1960s